Mert Kula (born 1 January 1995) is a Turkish professional footballer who plays as a defender for Gençlerbirliği.

Professional career
Mert made his professional debut for Kasımpaşa in a 2–0 Süper Lig loss to Beşiktaş J.K. on 23 November 2014.
Kula made his Turkey U19 debut in a 5-2 loss against Hungary U19 on 23 April 2014.

References

External links

1995 births
People from Çatalca
Footballers from Istanbul
Living people
Turkish footballers
Turkey youth international footballers
Association football defenders
Kasımpaşa S.K. footballers
Sarıyer S.K. footballers
Menemenspor footballers
Kayserispor footballers
Ankara Keçiörengücü S.K. footballers
Gençlerbirliği S.K. footballers
Süper Lig players
TFF First League players
TFF Second League players